Troitsky is a rural locality (a settlement) and the administrative center of Troitskaya Territorial Administration, Gubkinsky District, Belgorod Oblast, Russia. The population was 6,214 as of 2010. There are 12 streets.

Geography 
Troitsky is located 12 km north of Gubkin (the district's administrative centre) by road. Mikhaylovsky is the nearest rural locality.

References 

Rural localities in Gubkinsky District